Atrilleon Williams (born December 29, 1999) is an American football cornerback for the Miami Dolphins of the National Football League (NFL). He played college football at Syracuse.

Early years
Williams attended Archbishop Stepinac High School in White Plains, New York. He played cornerback, running back and wide receiver in high school. As a senior, he was The Journal News Player of the Year. Williams committed to Syracuse University to play college football.

College career
Williams played at Syracuse from 2018 to 2020. He finished his career with 92 tackles, four interceptions and three touchdowns. After playing in the first five games his junior year in 2020, Williams sat out the rest of the season to prepare for the 2021 NFL Draft.

Professional career

New Orleans Saints
After going undrafted, Williams signed with the New Orleans Saints as an undrafted free agent on May 11, 2021. He was waived three days later after failing his physical.

Miami Dolphins
On May 17, 2021, Williams was claimed off waivers by the Miami Dolphins. He was placed on injured reserve with a torn ACL on August 15, 2022.

References

External links
Syracuse Orange bio

1999 births
Living people
Sportspeople from Yonkers, New York
Players of American football from New York (state)
American football cornerbacks
Syracuse Orange football players
New Orleans Saints players
Miami Dolphins players
Archbishop Stepinac High School alumni